Nicholas or Nick Taylor may refer to:

Sportspeople
 Nick Taylor (cricketer, born 1963), English cricketer
 Nick Taylor (squash player) (born 1971), British squash player and squash coach
 Nicholas Taylor (tennis) (born 1979), American wheelchair tennis player
 Nick Taylor (basketball) (born 1980), Australian Paralympic wheelchair basketball player
 Nick Taylor (golfer) (born 1988), Canadian professional golfer
 Nick Taylor (Canadian football) (born 1988), defensive back with the Orlando Predators
 Nick Taylor (cricketer, born 1996), English cricketer
 Nick Taylor (footballer) (born 1998), American-Cambodian soccer player
 Nick Taylor (rugby league), rugby league player with the Coventry Bears

Other people 
 Nicholas Taylor (politician) (1927–2020), Canadian politician
 Nick Taylor (Bloodrock) (1946–2010), American hard rock and rhythm guitarist/musician for the Texas band Bloodrock
 Nick Taylor (DJ), trance, house and electro musician with the band Prana
 Van Taylor (Nicholas Van Campen Taylor, born 1972), American politician

See also
 Nic Taylor (born 1991), British footballer